Chip 'n' Dale: Park Life is an animated streaming television series based on the cartoon characters Chip 'n' Dale. The series premiered on Disney+ on July 28, 2021, and is co-produced by The Walt Disney Company France and Xilam Animation. Unlike other iterations of the characters, the series is non-verbal, similar to other shows produced by Xilam.

On June 15, 2022, it was announced the series was renewed for a second season.

In the U.S., it premiered on Disney Channel on January 9, 2023, and on Disney XD on January 14, 2023 on linear television.

Cast
 Matthew Géczy as Chip
 Kaycie Chase as Dale
 Cindy Lee Delong as Clarice, Fifi, Pluto's pups
 Bill Farmer as Pluto
 Sylvain Caruso as Donald Duck
 David Gasman as Beagle Boys, Butch

Episodes

Reception
On review aggregator Rotten Tomatoes, the series has a rating of 80% based on reviews from 5 critics.

Kristy Puchko of IGN rated the series 8 out of 10 and found it to be a refreshing interpretation of Chip and Dale, while praising the animation and complimenting the humor of the show. Ashley Moulton of Common Sense Media rated Chip 'n' Dale: Park Life 3 out of 5 stars, found agreeable the presence of positive messages and role models, citing friendship and curiosity, and found the series entertaining across its humor. Jenna Anderson of Comicbook.com rated the series 3 out of 5 stars, acclaimed the animation style and complimented the performances of the voice actors, but stated that the series is narratively too simplified.

References

External links 
 Chip 'n' Dale: Park Life on Disney+
 

2020s American animated television series
2020s French animated television series
2021 American television series debuts
2021 French television series debuts
American children's animated comedy television series
French children's animated comedy television series
American flash animated television series
French flash animated television series
Disney+ original programming
Disney animated television series
English-language television shows
Animated television series reboots
Animated television series about mammals
Television series by Disney
Xilam